The twelfth season of Degrassi, a Canadian serial teen drama television series, premiered on July 16, 2012, concluded on June 21, 2013, and consists of 40 episodes. Although only three school years have passed in the story timeline since season six, season twelve is set in the spring semester in the years it aired. Writers have been able to use a semi-floating timeline, so that the issues depicted are modern for their viewers. This season again depicts the lives of a group of high school freshmen, sophomores, juniors, and seniors as they deal with some of the challenges and issues that teenagers face such as homophobia, theft, religion, sexual harassment, dysfunctional families, peer pressure, pregnancy scares, stress, self image, self-injury, suicide, drug use, burglary, parenthood, depression, grief and relationships. 

This season continues the telenovela/soap opera format that began in season 10, with new episodes premiering four days a week, for the first five weeks. MuchMusic announced renewing the series for a twelfth season in June 2011. The series' American broadcaster, TeenNick, announced a summer run, following the season 11 finale. Production for the season began on February 27, 2012, at Epitome Pictures' studios in Toronto, Ontario. The first 20 episodes were promoted as Degrassi Showdown.

Cast
The twelfth season has twenty-seven actors receiving star billing with twenty-three of them returning from the previous season. Returning cast members include:

 Shanice Banton as Marisol Lewis (24 episodes)
 Luke Bilyk as Drew Torres (25 episodes)
 Stefan Brogren as Archie "Snake" Simpson (13 episodes)
 Munro Chambers as Eli Goldsworthy (31 episodes)
 Annie Clark as Fiona Coyne (26 episodes)
 Sam Earle as K.C. Guthrie (6 episodes)
 Jahmil French as Dave Turner (24 episodes)
 Ricardo Hoyos as Zig Novak (21 episodes)
 Alicia Josipovic as Bianca DeSousa (27 episodes)
 Daniel Kelly as Owen Milligan (10 episodes)
 Justin Kelly as Jake Martin (24 episodes)
 Cory Lee as Ms. Oh (7 episodes)
 Jacob Neayem as Mo Mashkour (24 episodes)
 Lyle O'Donohoe as Tristan Milligan (27 episodes)
 Aislinn Paul as Clare Edwards (29 episodes)
 Cristine Prosperi as Imogen Moreno (25 episodes)
 Chloe Rose as Katie Matlin (26 episodes)
 A.J. Saudin as Connor DeLaurier (20 episodes)
 Olivia Scriven as Maya Matlin (30 episodes)
 Melinda Shankar as Alli Bhandari (26 episodes)
 Alex Steele as Tori Santamaria (26 episodes)
 Jordan Todosey as Adam Torres (20 episodes)
 Jessica Tyler as Jenna Middleton (22 episodes)

Joining the main cast this season are: 

 Craig Arnold as Luke Baker (18 episodes)
 Dylan Everett as Campbell Saunders (19 episodes)
 Sarah Fisher as Becky Baker (20 episodes)
 Demetrius Joyette as Mike "Dallas" Dallas (29 episodes)

The only actor from season eleven who did not return this season in any capacity was Spencer Van Wyck who played Wesley Betenkamp.

Crew
Season twelve is produced by Epitome Pictures in association with Bell Media. Funding was provided by The Canadian Media Fund, The Shaw Rocket Fund, RBC Royal Bank, The Canadian Film or Video Production Tax Credit, and the Ontario Film and Television Tax Credit.

Linda Schuyler, co-creator of the Degrassi franchise and CEO of Epitome Pictures, served as an executive producer with her husband, and President of Epitome Pictures, Stephen Stohn. Michael Grassi is also credited as a co-executive producer, Ramona Barckert and Matt Huether as consulting producers, Sarah Glinski an executive producer, and Ella Schwarzman an executive post producer. Stefan Brogren was series producer, while David Lowe is credited as producer, and Stephanie Williams the supervising producer. The casting director was Stephanie Gorin, and the editors are Jason B. Irvine, Gordon Thorne, and Paul Whitehead.

The executive story editor is Ramona Barckert, the story editors are Matt Schiller and Lauren Gosnell, and Ian Malone is the story coordinator. Episode writers for the season are Ramona Barckert, Sarah Glinski, Michael Grassi, Lauren Gosnell, Matt Huether, James Hurst, Ian Malone, Shelley Scarrow, Matt Schiller, and Brendon Yorke. The directors of photography are John Berrie and Mitchell T. Ness, and the directors are Stefan Brogren, Phil Earnshaw, Sturla Gunnarsson, Eleanore Lindo, Mitchell T. Ness, Samir Rehem, and Pat Williams.

Reception
A writer for AfterElton gave the summer block a positive review, saying that it "has easily been the best-written run of Degrassi episodes in several seasons." At the 44th NAACP Image Awards, Degrassi was nominated for an award in "Outstanding Children's Program". At the 1st Canadian Screen Awards director Phil Earnshaw received an award for "Best Direction in a Children’s or Youth Program or Series" for the episode "Scream" Part Two. In addition, Dylan Everett and Aislinn Paul were both nominated for "Best Performance in a Children's or Youth Program or Series" for their performances in "Rusty Cage" Part Two and "Waterfalls" Part Two respectively, also nominated were two performances from season 11, and winner, and fellow Degrassi actress, Melinda Shankar for her performance in How to be Indie.

Degrassi was nominated for a GLAAD Media Award in the Outstanding Drama Series category, alongside Grey's Anatomy, The L.A. Complex, True Blood, and winner Smash. These awards, honour works that fairly and accurately represent the LGBT community and issues. At the 17th Annual PRISM Awards, Degrassi received an award in the Teen Program category for their portrayal of "drug, alcohol and tobacco use and addiction, as well as mental health issues".

Episodes
The first run, of 20 episodes, aired in July and August 2012, for a total of five weeks. Except for the summe finale, this season again aired episodes on the same nights in Canada and the United States. Three one-hour specials aired, the fall finale, another three weeks later, and the finale three weeks before season 13. The opening credits were revised twice this season, to reflect the changing cast, Sam Earle was removed in the 15th episode, and Dylan Everett was removed in the 33rd episode.

DVD release

References

External links
 List of Degrassi: The Next Generation episodes at IMDB.

Degrassi: The Next Generation seasons
2012 Canadian television seasons
2013 Canadian television seasons